The Milwaukee Depot in Missoula, Montana, was built by the Chicago, Milwaukee, St. Paul and Pacific Railroad (otherwise known as The Milwaukee Road) in 1910 as part of the railroad's transcontinental "Pacific Extension".

The depot complex consists of two buildings, both made of brick. The depot itself is a two-story rectangular building that had passenger waiting rooms and the station agent's office. The second floor contained railroad offices. The depot has two towers that rise above it. There is a Mission influence in the tile roofs and decoration. The second building was the baggage room.

When the railroad went bankrupt in the mid-1980s, the buildings were sold and turned into a restaurant and bar. A new addition was built that connected the depot with the baggage room. In the late 1980s, the restaurant went out of business and the building sat vacant.

In the mid-1990s, the building was bought by the Boone and Crockett Club who moved their national headquarters there from Washington, DC.  The club leased the second floor to the University of Montana for use as offices.

The depot was placed on the National Register of Historic Places due to its architecture and also due to its association with the commercial development of Missoula.

References
Michels, Kirk, and James R. McDonald. Milwaukee Depot (Missoula County, Montana) National Register of Historic Places Inventory-Nomination Form, National Park Service, Washington, DC, 1982.
Missoula Community Redevelopment Agency memo on the depot

See also
Milwaukee Depot (disambiguation) - Other stations known by the name

External links

 Boone and Crockett Club

Railway stations on the National Register of Historic Places in Montana
Railway stations in the United States opened in 1910
Missoula
National Register of Historic Places in Missoula, Montana
Transportation in Missoula County, Montana
1910 establishments in Montana